Marie Větrovská (later Široká, June 26, 1912 – May 21, 1987) was a Czechoslovak gymnast who competed in the 1936 Summer Olympics.

She was born in Prague.

In 1936 she won the silver medal as member of the Czechoslovak gymnastics team.

External links
 profile

.

1912 births
1987 deaths
Czechoslovak female artistic gymnasts
Olympic gymnasts of Czechoslovakia
Gymnasts at the 1936 Summer Olympics
Olympic silver medalists for Czechoslovakia
Olympic medalists in gymnastics
Medalists at the 1936 Summer Olympics
Gymnasts from Prague